Stocking is a quantitative measure of the area occupied by trees, usually measured in terms of well-spaced trees or basal area per hectare, relative to an optimum or desired level of density. It is also known as a measure of the growth potential of a site that may be affected by vegetation in the area along with other nearby trees. Stocking can be shown as a ratio of the current stand density to the stand density of a maximally-occupied site. Stocking measures account for three things: the cover type and species mixture in the stand, the basal area per acre, and the number of trees per acre.

Stocking allows for the comparison of stands that may have diverse ecology. Stocking is a major part of forest management and how to control the growth of trees in certain areas. They have developed more approaches that account for different ages of stands and grow areas. When managing forests, foresters want the most amount of growth and volume in different stands and areas across the world. A desirable level of stocking is often considered that which maximizes timber production, or other management objectives.

Stand density is not the same as stocking. See stand density index for the difference.

Stocking charts 

Once the stands have been measured, they are marked as either being overstocked, 50% stocked, or understocked. When an area is overstocked it means that it has too many trees in the given area, and it will be affecting the growth of other trees that are around it. When an area is understocked, it means that the stand site is not up to its full potential in tree growth. More trees should be planted there if they want to maximize the tree growth in the stand site. Stocking charts, or stocking guides, are helpful in determining whether a stand is overstocked, 50% stocked, or understocked. When you have two stands that have similar basal areas but different amounts of trees in the stand you can compare to see if there is a difference. In these charts there are 2 reference lines, A and B, these lines show where an area is being overstocked, understocked, or fully stocked. The A-line represents the limit for an uncut forest. If it was over the A-line, then it would be considered overstocked with trees. The B-line represents the best number of trees to be grown in each area based on the space in the stand. The B-line is also a representation of the stand being understocked and that the area is not up to its full growth potential. If the area of a planted stand is between the A and B lines, they will reduce the number of trees down to the B line, so they get the maximum growth out of the trees. Foresters usually want to have a stand around the B-line because it will give them the maximum growth out of the stand and use the fewest trees possible. But this is also a difficult decision because if you make a cut into the stand and try to make it down to the B-line this could influence the trees that are left in the stand, and they may not grow as the forester thought they would.

When it comes to a stand that is overstocked or understocked it is important to make the correct decision on how to get the most growth potential. When you have a stand that is right on the edge of being understocked it may not be beneficial to plant more trees in the stand. Planting more trees, it may cause the stand to become overstocked, and you won’t have the maximum growth potential. When you have a stand that is very understocked there are two options that you have in helping the stand. You can either plant new trees in the stand as an underplant, or you can clearcut the stand and restart by planting all new trees. If you have a stand that is fully stocked, you will still want to pay attention to it because modifications may need to be made in order to keep the stand staying in the stocked area in the chart. It is important to also speak to a professional in whether you should keep the stand as it is or if you should reduce the stand so that you can obtain the maximum potential growth.

Measurement types

Basal area per acre 
When it comes to stocking, you are measuring a tree’s basal area. It is a cross-sectional area that is about 4.5 feet above the ground in the center of the tree. The basal area is measured in square feet per tree in the given stand. The equation for calculating the basal area of trees in a stand is, Basal Area = 0.005454 DBH2, where DBH is located at 4.5 feet above the ground surface calculated in inches and is the diameter of the tree. When you are calculating the basal area you may need to have more calculations for stands that are larger whereas if you have a stand that is smaller it will require fewer basal area measurements to be taken. The base number for the number of measurements that should be taken in a stand is 20 – 25 and this should give you a good estimate for most stands.

When calculating basal area foresters use a special prism or gauge that can help get precise estimates. Not every stand is a uniform stand and so numerous measurements will need to be taken at the same spot so that you can have precise measurements in the stand.

Trees per acre 
When looking at stocking it is also important to account for the trees per acre in your stand. This follows the same principle of basal area. When looking at the trees per acre make several estimates in the stand and take the average so that you have the most reliable source of information.

See also

 Stand level modelling

References

Stocking